Eucalyptus sideroxylon, commonly known as mugga ironbark, or red ironbark is a small to medium-sized tree that is endemic to eastern Australia. It has dark, deeply furrowed ironbark, lance-shaped adult leaves, flower buds in groups of seven, white, red, pink or creamy yellow flowers and cup-shaped to shortened spherical fruit.

Description
The bark is dark grey to black, deeply furrowed ironbark on the trunk and larger branches, smooth white to grey on the thinnest branches. Flowering occurs from April to December and the flowers are white, red, pink or creamy yellow.

Taxonomy and naming
Allan Cunningham recorded the name Eucalyptus sideroxylon in Thomas Mitchell's 1848 Journal of an Expedition into the Interior of Tropical Australia but did not provide a description of the plant. The first formal description of the species was published in 1887 by William Woolls in Proceedings of the Linnean Society of New South Wales.

Two subspecies of E. sideroxylon are accepted by the Australian Plant Census as at December 2019:
 Eucalyptus sideroxylon subsp. improcera A.R.Bean is a small, stunted tree and has shorter, wider leaves than the autonym and longer flower buds;
 Eucalyptus sideroxylon A.Cunn. ex Woolls subsp. sideroxylon.

Distribution and habitat
Mugga ironbark is widespread and often abundant in woodland from south-eastern Queensland through New South Wales to Victoria. Subspecies improcera is only known from the Barakula State Forest north-northwest of Chinchilla.

Uses
The leaves are used in the production of cineole based eucalyptus oil.

Apiarists in New South Wales place hives in red-ironbark woodlands to collect the honey.

Chemistry
Molecules produced by plants in case of pathogens attacks are called phytoalexins. Such compounds can be implied in the hypersensitive response of plants. High levels of polyphenols (stilbenoids and ellagitannins) in E. sideroxylon wood can explain its natural preservation against rot.

See also
 List of Eucalyptus species

References

Department of Primary Industries: Red Ironbark

Flora of New South Wales
Flora of Victoria (Australia)
Flora of Queensland
Trees of Australia
sideroxylon
Myrtales of Australia
Ornamental trees
Drought-tolerant trees
Plants described in 1887